This is a list of episodes of Ultra Maniac.

Ultra Maniac